And If We Should Meet Again is a 1947 German drama film directed by Hans Müller and starring Paul Dahlke, Käthe Haack and Willi Rose. It was part of the post-war group of Rubble films. It was shot at the Tempelhof Studios in Berlin and on location around Lüdenscheid and at Altena Castle. The film's sets were designed by the art director Gerhard Ladner.

Synopsis
In the final days of the Second World War, five boys evacuated to Westphalia want to travel to Berlin to defend the capital from Allied forces. Gradually they become more disillusioned by the war and their faith in the Nazi regime is broken. Gehlhorn, an older soldier, becomes an effective father figure to them and helps them survive the fighting.

Cast

References

Bibliography

External links 
 

1947 films
West German films
1940s German-language films
Films directed by Hans Müller
German black-and-white films
German drama films
1947 drama films
1940s German films
Films shot at Tempelhof Studios